John Parke (6 August 1937 – 27 August 2011) was a footballer, who played for Linfield, Hibernian, Sunderland, Vancouver Royal Canadians, KV Mechelen and the Northern Ireland national football team as a full back.

Club career
He started his professional footballing career in his native Northern Ireland with Cliftonville before joining their rivals Linfield in 1954. Having been a key player in the club's 'Seven Trophy' season of 1961/62, he moved to Scotland with Hibernian in 1963 where he made 23 appearances, scoring no goals. Parke moved to Sunderland in November 1964 and made his debut on 21 November, against Sheffield United in a 3–0 defeat at Bramall Lane. He went on to make 85 league appearances for the club. He joined Belgian club KV Mechelen before retiring in 1968.

International career
He won his first cap for Northern Ireland on 12 November 1963 in a 2–1 win against Scotland. He went on to make a further 13 caps for his country, making it a total of 14 caps, with 0 goals.

Death
Parke died of Alzheimer's disease in 2011, aged 74.

References

External links
Newcastle Fans profile

1937 births
Northern Ireland international footballers
Association footballers from Northern Ireland
Expatriate association footballers from Northern Ireland
NIFL Premiership players
Cliftonville F.C. players
Linfield F.C. players
Hibernian F.C. players
Sunderland A.F.C. players
Scottish Football League players
English Football League players
K.V. Mechelen players
Belgian Pro League players
Expatriate footballers in Belgium
Deaths from Alzheimer's disease
Deaths from dementia in Northern Ireland
2011 deaths
Vancouver Royals players
United Soccer Association players
Expatriate soccer players in Canada
Association football defenders